Hero syndrome is a term used by media to describe the behavior of a person seeking heroism or recognition, usually by creating a harmful situation to objects or persons which they then can resolve. This can include unlawful acts, such as arson. The term has been used to describe behavior of civil servants, such as firefighters, nurses, police officers, security guards and politicians. Reasons for this kind of behavior often vary.

In a federal study of more than 80 firefighter arsonists, the most common reason cited for starting the fire was simply the excitement of putting it out, not to cause harm or exact revenge.

Screening
A screening method has been developed, based on the case that those who commit the acts are generally young and are looking for an opportunity to prove or flaunt their bravery. However, there are no formal scientific studies on hero syndrome.

See also
 Firefighter arson

References

Psychopathological syndromes
Complex (psychology)
Heroes